The 1906 Vanderbilt Cup was a motor race held on a 29.7 mile street circuit on Long Island, New York on October 6, 1906.

Just like the 1906 Vanderbilt Elimination Race, this race was stopped as the crowd invaded the course.

Classification

See also 
 1906 Vanderbilt Elimination Race

References

Vanderbilt Cup
Vanderbilt Cup
Vanderbilt Cup